Four Freshmen and 5 Trombones is a 1956 album by The Four Freshmen "It reached number six nationally and resided on the charts for over eight months." It was the first album bought by Brian Wilson, who would be greatly influenced by the Four Freshmen when starting The Beach Boys. Later, the Four Freshmen were acclaimed as "the most innovative and imitated jazz vocal quartet ever to grace vinyl". Straddling vocal jazz and pop music, they were inducted into the Vocal Group Jazz Hall of Fame in 2001.

The album was rereleased as one of two LPs on one CD.

Track list 
 “Angel Eyes” (Matt Dennis, Earl Brent) – 3:32
 “Love Is Just around the Corner” (Lewis Gensler, Leo Robin) – 2:00
 “Mam'selle” (Edmund Goulding, Mack Gordon) – 3:03
 “Speak Low” (Kurt Weill, Ogden Nash) – 3:06
 “The Last Time I Saw Paris” (Jerome Kern, Oscar Hammerstein II) – 2:40
 “Somebody Loves Me (George Gershwin, Ballard MacDonald, Buddy DeSylva) – 2:06
 “You Stepped Out of a Dream” (Nacio Herb Brown, Gus Kahn) – 2:17
 “I Remember You” (Victor Schertzinger, Johnny Mercer) – 3:10
 “Love” (Ralph Blane, Hugh Martin) – 2:45
 “Love Is Here to Stay” (George Gershwin, Ira Gershwin) – 3:12
 “You Made Me Love You” (James V. Monaco, Joseph McCarthy) – 2:14
 “Guilty” (Richard A. Whiting, Harry Akst, Gus Kahn) – 3:33

Personnel 
 The Four Freshmen: Don Barbour, Ross Barbour, Bob Flanigan, Ken Errair – vocals
 Frank Rosolino, Harry Betts, Milt Bernhart, Tommy Pederson, George Roberts – trombone
 Claude Williamson – piano
 Barney Kessel – guitar
 Joe Mondragon – bass
 Shelly Manne – drums
 Pete Rugolo – arrangements

References

1956 albums
The Four Freshmen albums
Capitol Records albums
Albums arranged by Pete Rugolo